The Bay View riot may refer to:

 The 1886 Bay View massacre, in which the Wisconsin National Guard killed during a labor strike
 The 1917 Bay View incident between anarchists and police in Milwaukee